Lady Minto Hospital is an acute care facility in Cochrane, Ontario and part of the MIC's Group of Health Services in Northern Ontario.

Founded in 1911, the hospital building was built in 1915 and opened in 1916. The hospital is named for Mary Caroline Grey, wife of Lord Minto (Gilbert Elliot-Murray-Kynynmound, 4th Earl of Minto), Governor General of Canada. The hospitals building funds were made available from the Lady Minto Hospital Fund given around 1900.

The main hospital has 33 beds and a long-term care facility with 33 beds. Services also include in-patient, out-patient, respite, palliative, emergency and ambulatory care.

History

Lady Minto Hospital was one of 43 hospitals built from funds established by Lady Minto and the Victorian Order of Nurses.

The funds were given to build cottage hospitals in remote parts of Canada.

A timeline of Cochrane's Lady Minto Hospital:

 1915-1916 first hospital building built
 1953-1954 new hospital addition built to ease overcrowding at the 44-bed hospital
 1960s renovations 
 1975-1978 new 64-bed hospital building built; old hospital building becomes Minto Health Centre
 2003 new Minto Health Centre built; 2004 old hospital demolished

See also
 Tim Horton - born at Lady Minto on January 12, 1930

References

External links
 MICs Group of Health Services - Lady Minto Hospital

Hospitals in Ontario
Hospital buildings completed in 1916
Hospital buildings completed in 1954
Hospital buildings completed in 1978
Hospitals established in 1911
Buildings and structures in Cochrane District
Cochrane, Ontario
Cottage hospitals